"Something to Remember You By" is a song recorded by Canadian country music group Prairie Oyster. It was released in 1991 as the fourth single from their second studio album, Different Kind of Fire. It peaked at number 5 on the RPM Country Tracks chart in May 1991.

Chart performance

Year-end charts

References

1991 singles
Prairie Oyster songs
RCA Records singles
1990 songs
Songs written by Joan Besen
Songs written by Keith Glass